Kosmos 116 ( meaning Cosmos 116), also known as DS-P1-Yu No.6 was a Soviet satellite which was used as a radar calibration target for tests of anti-ballistic missiles. It was built by the Yuzhnoye Design Bureau, and launched in 1966 as part of the Dnepropetrovsk Sputnik programme.

Kosmos 116 was launched using a Kosmos-2M 63S1M carrier rocket, which flew from Site 86/1 at Kapustin Yar. The launch occurred at 10:04 GMT on 26 April 1966, and was successful. It decayed from orbit on 3 December 1966. Kosmos 116 was the fifth of seventy nine DS-P1-Yu satellites to be launched, and the fourth of seventy two to successfully reach orbit.

See also

 1966 in spaceflight

References

Spacecraft launched in 1966
Kosmos 0116
1966 in the Soviet Union
Dnepropetrovsk Sputnik program